Steven Lang (sometimes spelled Stephen Lang) is a fictional character, a supervillain appearing in American comic books published by Marvel Comics. He is a manufacturer of the mutant-hunting robots called Sentinels. He first appeared in The X-Men #96.

Fictional character biography
Dr. Steven Lang is a pioneer in the field of robotics and genetic mutation who hates mutants. An employee of the U.S. government, he is placed in charge of a federal investigation into the origin of genetic mutation. He plans to use his talents to create an army of mutant hunting robots to kill all mutants. To this end, he seeks to get the government to endorse and financially support his operations.

Lang begins by targeting mutant criminals such as Mesmero. He claims possession of Bolivar Trask's wrecked Sentinel base and its resources, and is backed by Ned Buckman and the "Council of the Chosen," the secret group in control of the New York Branch of the Hellfire Club prior to Sebastian Shaw's takeover.

To defeat his main targets, the X-Men, Lang creates the "X-Sentinels," android doubles of Professor X and the original X-Men. However, the X-Sentinels manage only inferior imitations of the X-Men's powers, and are easily defeated by the new X-Men. Jean Grey then telekinetically forces Lang to crash his mini-gunship into a wall-screen. He is left in a coma with severe brain damage. During this time, Lang's brain is used as a template for the minds of two sentinels, Conscience and a new Master Mold, both of whom are destroyed in an attempt to release a virus which would have killed all mutants and roughly 97% of normal humans on Earth.

Years later, Lang returns as a member of the Phalanx, a group of humans who had been transformed into techno-organic human-alien hybrids. The transformation process restores Lang's mind, and he becomes their leader. Lang is the only one of the Phalanx to retain his individual human identity, possibly due to the brain damage. While he is ardent in his desire to see mutants eradicated, he comes to realize the Phalanx are a danger to humans as well. He conspires with the X-Men to destroy the Phalanx citadel on Earth, following which he is dragged to his apparent death by his lieutenant, Cameron Hodge.

Lang's corpse is exhumed by the Purifiers and reanimated by Bastion using a Technarch. He joins a group formed by the foremost anti-mutant leaders under Bastion's control. During the Second Coming storyline, Steven Lang, alongside Graydon Creed, is killed by Hope Summers.

Powers and abilities
As a normal human being Stephen Lang had no superhuman powers. However, he was a genius and pioneer in the field of robotics, with adequate financial resources to fund his operations. 

As a member of the Phalanx he had all of the characteristics of a techno-organic life form: enhanced strength, durability, and agility, ability to re-shape corporeal form at will, and to infect other beings with the techno-organic virus and control infected beings.

Other versions
In the 2009-2010 miniseries X-Men Noir, Lang is a fictional character and lead for Bolivar Trask's pulp sci-fi series, "The Sentinels", who seeks to protect humanity from mutants.

References

Comics characters introduced in 1975
Marvel Comics cyborgs
Fictional roboticists
Marvel Comics characters who are shapeshifters
Marvel Comics characters with superhuman strength
Marvel Comics mutates
Marvel Comics male supervillains
Fictional mass murderers
Characters created by John Byrne (comics)
Characters created by Chris Claremont